Tugnuy (Tügne) is a rural locality (a selo) in Mukhorshibirsky District, Republic of Buryatia, Russia. The population was 740 as of 2010. There are 12 streets.

Geography 
Tugnuy is located 40 km northeast of Mukhorshibir (the district's administrative centre) by road. Bom is the nearest rural locality.

References 

Rural localities in Mukhorshibirsky District